The 94th Indianapolis 500 was held at the Indianapolis Motor Speedway in Speedway, Indiana on Sunday, May 30, 2010. It was the 15th Indy 500 sanctioned by the Indy Racing League, and was the premier event of the 2010 IZOD IndyCar Series season. The race was won by Dario Franchitti, ahead of Dan Wheldon and Marco Andretti. Tony Kanaan, who had started in the final position, ran as high as second during the race before finishing eleventh.

The race was the second of the three-year-long Centennial era, celebrating the 100th anniversary of the opening of the Indianapolis Motor Speedway and the 100th anniversary of the first Indianapolis 500. It was the 53rd time the race had been held on a May 30. This year marked the first race with four female drivers (repeated in 2011), and Simona de Silvestro was awarded Rookie of the Year.

Event news

Qualifying for the event reverted to a schedule used between 1998 and 2000, in which the grid was set across a single weekend rather than two.
The pole position was decided under a new "shootout" format, loosely based on the qualifying format used during IndyCar Series road course events. The "Fast Nine" cars erased their earlier times, and make up to two attempts apiece during the special session to determine who will win the pole position. Cash prizes for the front row have been increased from previous years: pole position ($175,000), second place ($75,000), and third place ($50,000). Participants were also awarded IndyCar Series points towards the championship based on their qualifying position. Points were awarded based on a special descending scale for all starting positions, with the pole winner receiving 15 points, second place 13, and third place 12.
 Prior to the start of the race, Michael Andretti drove Mark Wahlberg in a custom-built, two-seat Indy car billed as the "Izod Fastest Seat in Sports". The 1969 Indianapolis 500 winner Mario Andretti coached the two by radio from the IZOD Performance Pit. Andretti and Wahlberg followed four parade cars and led the official pace car and the 33-car starting field on three parade laps. Once the parade cars exited the circuit, the two-seat race car sped around the track at nearly 200 mph to catch the field from behind as the field took the green flag. This marked the first time in modern history that a driver and passenger joined the field of the Indianapolis 500. It was the first two-man race car on the track since the days of the riding mechanic ended after 1937.
 Five women attempted the Indy 500; four qualified for the event.

Rule changes
For the first time, the Honda overtake assist system ("Push-to-pass") was utilized. Each car was permitted 15 presses (18 seconds in duration) with a 10-second recharge time.

Schedule
The 2010 schedule was a two-week condensed schedule, but featured only one fewer day of on-track activity compared to 2009.

Entry list
See Team and driver chart for further information.

Practice

Saturday May 15
Weather: Partly cloudy, intermittent rain showers
Seven rookies participated in rookie orientation, and five veterans took part in refresher tests. Jay Howard (215.039 mph) was the fastest rookie of the day.

Sunday May 16
Weather: Cloudy, intermittent rain showers
During veteran practice, two incidents were reported. Ryan Hunter-Reay spun in the warm up lane in turn one, but did not make contact. At  Dan Wheldon lost control in turn four and hit the outside wall at the exit of turn four. he was uninjured. Hélio Castroneves led the speed chart for the second day in a row.

Monday May 17
Weather: Rain, 
Practice summary: Practice was cancelled due to rain.

Tuesday May 18
Weather: Cloudy, intermittent rain showers
Practice summary: Five different teams comprised the top five positions on the speed chart. Late in the day E. J. Viso crashed in turn one, and was transported to the hospital with back pain.

Wednesday May 19
Weather: Cloudy, 
Practice summary: Thirty-four drivers took practice laps, with many working on race set-ups. The field completed 2,282 laps with no major incidents reported.

Thursday May 20
Weather: Partly cloudy, 
Practice summary: A total of 44 cars are currently at the Speedway, and 44 have passed technical inspection. Thirty-seven drivers have been on the track to date and turned 1,445 laps today and 7,289 laps this month. Alex Lloyd turned 81 laps today, more than any other driver. There were two cautions for a total of two hours, 35 minutes.

Friday May 21 – Fast Friday

Weather: Cloudy, 
Practice summary: All 36 drivers today were separated by .7745 of a second. Fifteen drivers turned laps of 225 mph or faster today.

Qualifying

Saturday May 22 – Pole Day

Weather: Partly cloudy, 
Pole Day summary: Pole Day 2010 opened up with A. J. Foyt IV and many others through the early part of the day. Andretti Autosport struggled through the most part of the day with Marco Andretti finishing in the middle part of the qualifiers and Danica Patrick who finished 23rd of all 24 drivers qualified. John Andretti failed to qualify, while Tony Kanaan crashed during his qualifying run splitting his engine in two. The new system was put into place that year with 24 drivers qualified, while still vulnerable to being bumped. The top nine drivers, in this case Hélio Castroneves, Will Power, Dario Franchitti, Ryan Briscoe, Alex Tagliani, Scott Dixon, Graham Rahal, Ed Carpenter, Hideki Mutoh, were all involved in a shootout for the pole position. The drivers' times were wiped out and each made one or more four-lap qualification attempts. Unlike the main portion of qualifying, during the shootout segment drivers did not have to withdraw previous qualification times to make another attempt; the fastest time for each driver during the shootout segment was used to order the drivers. Hélio Castroneves not only won the first session of qualifying, but also the shootout and the 2010 Indianapolis 500 pole position.

Sunday May 23 – Bump Day
Weather: Sunny, 
Bump Day summary: With 24 drivers qualified the previous day, the field started the day with eight spots open. In the morning practice session, Tony Kanaan suffered his second crash in two days. He suffered a nearly identical crash as Saturday in turn one, this time wrecking his back up car. Kanaan was uninjured, and the team was forced to repair the backup car, or Kanaan could possibly miss the race.

Time trials opened at 12:00 p.m., with several cars ready in the qualifying line. In the first hour, early runs filled the field to 33 cars. Several drivers put in safe speeds, including John Andretti, Sarah Fisher, Vítor Meira, Alex Lloyd, Bruno Junqueira. A. J. Foyt IV parted ways with his grandfather's team and Jaques Lazier was drafted as his replacement.

As of 1:00 p.m., the rear of the field consisted of the following drivers:
30. Paul Tracy - 223.892 mph
31. Jay Howard - 223.824 mph
32. Mario Romancini - 223.805 mph
33. Sebastián Saavedra - 223.634 mph (on the "bubble")
Bumped: Takuma Sato - 221.622 mph
Not yet qualified: Tony Kanaan, Milka Duno (wave off), Jaques Lazier

The temperature were rising into the low 90s °F, making it difficult to find speed out on the track. Most drivers stayed off the track during the hottest period of the afternoon, awaiting better conditions. At 5:23 p.m., Tony Kanaan took to the track in his repaired back-up car, and bumped his way into the field with a safe speed of 224.072 mph. Kanaan's run bumped Sebastián Saavedra of Bryan Herta Autosport from the field. Saavedra experienced trouble of his own, as he wrecked his car during a practice run Sunday afternoon. Saavedra was sent to the hospital, and would be unable to re-qualify. As of 5:30 p.m., Romancini was now on the bubble.

As of approximately 5:30 p.m., the rear of the field consisted of the following drivers:
30. Tony Kanaan - 224.075 mph
31. Paul Tracy - 223.892 mph
32. Jay Howard - 223.824 mph
33. Mario Romancini - 223.805 mph (on the "bubble")
Bumped: Sebastián Saavedra - 223.634 mph
Too slow: Jaques Lazier - 223.360 mph
Bumped: Takuma Sato - 221.622 mph
Not yet qualified: Milka Duno (wave off)

Mario Romancini withdrew his speed, and re-qualified, this time much faster. Jay Howard was now on the bubble. With twenty minutes remaining, Takuma Sato bumped Howard from the field. Paul Tracy now found himself on the bubble. With only fifteen minutes left in the day, the rear of the field consisted of the following drivers:

31. Takuma Sato - 224.178 mph
32. Tony Kanaan - 224.075 mph
33. Paul Tracy - 223.892 mph (on the "bubble")
Bumped: Jay Howard - 223.824 mph
Bumped: Sebastián Saavedra - 223.634 mph
Too slow: Jaques Lazier - 223.360 mph
Not yet qualified: Milka Duno (wave off)

Jay Howard attempted to bump his way back in the field, but his run of 223.610 mph was too slow. Paul Tracy still clung to the 33rd position. In a surprising move, he withdrew his speed at 5:50 p.m. Tracy hoped to put in a safer speed, and prevent Howard from getting another chance to qualify. Tracy's withdraw re-instated Sebastián Saavedra to the 33rd position. Tracy, however, got very loose in the hot conditions, and his speed ended up being slower. He waved off after only two laps, and hurriedly got back into the qualifying line. After quick wave-offs by Jaques Lazier and Milka Duno, the clock was running out. Sensing they were finally safe, Tony Kanaan's crew pulled their car out of line. Howard moved back to the front of the qualifying line with Tracy second in line.

With just minutes until the close of qualifying, the rear of the field consisted of the following drivers:
31. Takuma Sato - 224.178 mph
32. Tony Kanaan - 224.075 mph
33. Sebastián Saavedra - 223.634 mph (on the "bubble")
Too slow: Jay Howard - 223.610 mph
Withdrew: Paul Tracy
Failed to qualify: Jaques Lazier, Milka Duno

With two minutes left in the day, Jay Howard made his third and final attempt, in order to keep Tracy off the track. Howard's effort, however, was slower than the bubble speed. The 6 o'clock gun fired with Tracy still waiting in line. When Tracy withdrew his earlier attempt (223.892 mph), Sebastián Saavedra's car was re-instated to 33rd position, and he held on to make the field, while lying in a hospital bed. For the shoestring budget Bryan Herta Autosport team, the day was remembered as the "Bump Day Miracle."

Milka Duno made three attempts during the day, and none were run to completion. Jaques Lazier, who took over at the Foyt team, found little speed in his three attempts, and also missed the field. Howard and Tracy, however, were the heartbreak stories of the day. After qualifying closed, Andretti Autosport decided to replace Tony Kanaan's qualified back-up car with the primary machine. The decision forced Kanaan to move to the 33rd position, but since he had qualified 32nd, it was a drop of only one spot on the grid.

Carb Day

Indianapolis 500 Final Practice – Friday May 28

Weather: Sunny, 
This practice was the final one until the running of the Indianapolis 500 on Sunday. All 33 cars that qualified ran in this practice session.

Pit Stop Challenge

Starting grid

 = Former Indianapolis 500 winner
 = Indianapolis 500 rookie
(*) Tony Kanaan moved to the last starting position due to changes to the car
Failed to qualify

Race summary
Race Weather: Sunny and clear, 
Race Start Time:  EDT

Start
After the traditional starting command by Mari Hulman George, the pace car, driven by Robin Roberts, led the cars through the pace laps, followed by a special two-seater car driven by Michael Andretti and carrying Mark Wahlberg. Once the pace car came off the field, the two-seater sped around to join the back of the field, and honorary starter Jack Nicholson waved the green flag to start the race. (Nicholson refused to leave the flagstand and waved the green flag on the first two restarts, on laps 5 and 12.)

On the first lap, Davey Hamilton spun on turn two, bringing out the yellow flag. Hamilton blamed Tomas Scheckter, who had narrowly passed Hamilton on the outside, forcing Hamilton to correct. "Tomas Scheckter's an idiot... You know, he does it every year. I mean, it's not a surprise with him, and he gets away with it," said Hamilton. In just the half-lap of green-flag racing, however, Dario Franchitti had taken the lead, while Tony Kanaan had moved from the 33rd, final starting position to 25th.

The race returned to green-flag racing on lap 5, but a spin by Bruno Junqueira brought out another caution for laps 8–11. By this time, Kanaan had moved up to 17th.

First half
Franchitti held the lead for a long period of green-flag racing, until Will Power passed him for the lead on lap 31. However, on a pit stop, Power left before the fuel hose had been completely detached, leaving a coil dangling from his car. This would lead to a pit drive-through penalty for Power, dropping Power to 25th, as well as a caution period for debris as part of the coil fell onto the track. While Power would repeatedly work his way towards the front of the field, additional pit problems later in the race would lead to only an 8th-place finish.

Franchitti would maintain his lead beyond the halfway point of the race. Meanwhile, John Andretti spun into the wall on lap 65, and on the ensuing round of yellow-flag pit stops, both Scott Dixon and Raphael Matos lost wheels while pulling out and had to return to their pits. Kanaan improved eight spots, from 12th to 4th, on the same round of pit stops. Matos's race did not last much longer, as he spun into the wall on lap 73.

Second half

Vítor Meira hit the turn two wall in lap 106, bringing out the race's next caution. Ed Carpenter, who had been running well, had to come into the pits before they were officially open to avoid running out of fuel, but the rules then required him to come in again once the pits were open, costing him several spots. While most drivers came into the pits on the yellow, Tomas Scheckter stayed out, briefly taking the lead, but Franchitti quickly took it back after the race returned to green-flag status.

A long stretch of green-flag racing followed. Kanaan passed Hélio Castroneves and Scheckter to take the second spot, but Franchitti pulled away and had a lead of 9.7 seconds over Kanaan by lap 142. A series of green-flag pits on laps 143–147 resulted in Marco Andretti and Ryan Briscoe briefly taking the lead, in turn, before they had to pit and Franchitti re-emerged as the leader, with Andretti Autosport teammates Andretti and Kanaan in second and third, respectively. On the same round of pits, Castroneves stalled his car leaving the pits, dropping him from third to sixteenth. Continuing Penske Racing's problems, Briscoe crashed into the turn four wall on lap 148. Most drivers stayed out during this caution, but Castroneves pitted, hoping that there would be enough additional laps under caution to extend his fuel mileage and allow him to finish the race without pitting again. Kanaan passed Andretti under the following green flag to retake the second position.

Finish
A spin by rookie Sebastián Saavedra on lap 161 brought out another caution, and most drivers came into the pits, but Mike Conway, Justin Wilson, Castroneves, and Graham Rahal all stayed out, taking the top four spots, respectively. In the end, none of the four had enough fuel to complete the race and all had to pit before the end of the race under a green flag, giving Franchitti the lead again on lap 192, with Kanaan again in second. Kanaan's hopes for a "worst-to-first" race came to an end on lap 196 when he had to come in for additional fuel.

Franchitti slowed in the final laps to conserve fuel, but he was still able to stay ahead of second-place Dan Wheldon, who was also trying to save fuel. A dramatic crash occurred in the final lap as Ryan Hunter-Reay ran out of fuel and slowed, and Mike Conway hit Hunter-Reay's car, flipping Conway's car and sending it airborne and into the protective fence, shattering the car. Conway's teammate Ana Beatriz spun into the inside wall while avoiding the crash ahead of her. This brought out a final caution, and Franchitti led the field to the checkered flag, winning his second Indianapolis 500.

Conway was airlifted to nearby Methodist Hospital with a broken lower left leg. Of the crash, Hunter-Reay said, "I'm sorry Mike is hurt... It was totally uncalled for. We weren't going to make it anyway. When you run out of fuel in these cars, it's like hitting the brakes. In hindsight, we should have stopped for fuel." It was the only multi-car crash of the race. Two spectators were treated for minor injuries from the crash. ESPN SportsCenter and ESPN'S NASCAR Now program reported on May 31, 2010 Conway also suffered compression to his lower back and suffered a bad fracture to one of his vertebrae in his neck.

 After skulling the traditional bottle of milk for the winner, Franchitti stated "this tastes just as good the second time", referring to his victory in the 2007 race. Franchitti led for 155 of the race's 200 laps. He survived the final 36 laps without taking a pit stop.

Post-race summary
Franchitti's team's owner, Chip Ganassi had already won the Daytona 500 with Jamie McMurray. When McMurray won the Brickyard 400 at Indianapolis, Ganassi became the first owner to win the Daytona 500, Indy 500, and Brickyard 400 in the same season. The Harley J. Earl Trophy had been brought to the Indianapolis Motor Speedway—the first time it had ever been away from Daytona—and it stood side by side with the Borg-Warner Trophy.

Dan Wheldon finished second. In a post-race interview, he suggested that it was a mistake to be as conservative as he was on fuel: "I could see [Franchitti] at the end... unfortunately, I should have kept going 'cause I had fuel in the car when it came into the pits." However, Franchitti also had additional fuel, with 1.6 gallons remaining in his tank at the end of the race, even after taking a cool-down lap. It was the second consecutive second-place finish for Wheldon at the Indianapolis 500, and, along with Vítor Meira's finish in 2008, the third for Panther Racing.

Marco Andretti was initially reported to have finished sixth, but a post-race review revealed that three drivers had passed him during the final caution period, and he was restored to third place in the official race results, giving him his third top-three finish in five starts at the Indianapolis 500. The same review also revealed that Simona de Silvestro passed Mario Romancini after the caution came out, making Romancini, not de Silvestro, the highest finishing rookie, at 13th. Marco Andretti was one of the three Andretti Autosport drivers (out of the team's five entries) to finish in the top eleven, even though none of the Andretti drivers had qualified higher than sixteenth. As late as lap 191, four of the Andretti drivers had been in the top nine. Also among the Andretti drivers was Danica Patrick; starting twenty-third and finishing sixth, she scored the highest placement of the four female drivers in the race.

Hélio Castroneves, who started from the pole and was considered a pre-race favorite, finished ninth after his problematic pit stop, and his late-race fuel strategy failed to pan out. Castroneves praised Franchitti and took responsibility for his own finish, saying "I have to say, Dario was dominant. But this was the first time I feel like I let my guys down. We didn't have the best car, but we were better than ninth, certainly."

Tony Kanaan, who had started in last place and had run as high as second, finished eleventh after he had to pit for a final splash of fuel, but still garnered much applause from nearby fans as he exited his car after the race. Kanaan praised former teammate Franchitti: "The best car and the best driver today won the race."

Race results

Box Score
All cars utilized Dallara chassis, Honda engines, and Firestone Firehawk tires.

(*) Lloyd, Dixon, Patrick, and de Silvestro's finishing positions were adjusted downward after the race, for passing under yellow.

Race Leaders
8 drivers led the race, with a total of 13 lead changes.

Broadcasting

Television
The race was televised in high definition in the United States on ABC, the 46th consecutive year on that network. Marty Reid served as anchor. The telecast utilized the Side-by-Side format for commercial breaks.

"Fast Friday" Practice, Time trials, and Carb Day were shown live in high definition on Versus. Bob Jenkins served as anchor, along with Robbie Buhl and Jon Beekhuis as analysts. Jack Arute, Robbie Floyd, and Lindy Thackston covered the pits.

The race was carried live on TSN and on RDS in Canada, and on ESPN Latin America. In Brazil, the race was carried live on Band TV/BandSports.

Radio
The race was broadcast on radio by the IMS Radio Network. Mike King served as anchor. For the second time, Paul Page and Bob Jenkins joined the booth to offer commentary and observations. For the first time, the turn one reporting location was eliminated. Jerry Baker instead joined the booth as analyst. The turn one vantage point was eliminated due to the fact that the booth announcers had a clear view of that part of the track, and it allowed better continuity.

The driver expert was Indy Lights competitor James Hinchcliffe, who joined the crew for the first time. For the fourth year in a row, Davey Hamilton was part of the crew serving as live in-car reporter. However, he was involved in a crash at the start of the race, and was unable to give any reports. He instead visited the booth during the race.

Chris Denari, the television voice of the Indiana Fever, covered a Fever game against the Shock Saturday night before the race in Tulsa, Oklahoma. He then drove ten hours overnight back to Indianapolis to make it to the race on time.

For 2010, a special change was made for the famous out-cue "Stay tuned for the greatest spectacle in racing." Rather than just have the chief announcer recite the line, numerous drivers from the starting field were recorded introducing themselves and reciting the cue. Each commercial break attempted to feature a different driver.

See also

List of Indianapolis 500 winners
Indianapolis 500 by year
Indy Racing League
IndyCar Series

References

Indianapolis 500 races
Indianapolis 500
Indianapolis 500
Indianapolis 500
Indianapolis 500